In Mexico there are three major kinds of public holidays:

 Statutory holiday: Holidays observed all around Mexico. Employees are entitled to a day off with regular pay and schools (public and private) are closed for the day.
 Civic holiday: These holidays are observed nationwide, but employees are not entitled to a day off with pay and schools (public and private) still continue.
 Festivities: These are traditional holidays to honor religious events, such as Carnival, Holy Week, Easter, etc. or public celebrations, such as Mother's Day, Father's Day, Valentine's Day, etc.

Dia de la Independence or Anniversario de la Independence, September 16, commemorates Mexico's independence from Spain and is the most important patriotic statutory holiday. Parades are held and many schools are closed.

Statutory holidays
Statutory holidays (referred as "feriados" or "días de asueto" in Mexico) are legislated through the federal government and ruled by the Federal Labor Law (Ley Federal del Trabajo). Most workers, public and private, are entitled to take the day off with regular pay. However, some employers may require employees to work on such a holiday, but the employee must be paid:

 the regular pay for the statutory holiday if no work is performed by the employee, and
 the regular pay and two additional daily salary rates if work is performed by the employee, for a total of triple the usual rate.

When a statutory holiday falls on a Sunday, Monday is considered a statutory holiday; if a statutory holiday falls on Saturday, Friday will be considered a statutory holiday.

In addition to these dates, election days designated by federal and local electoral laws are also statutory holidays.

Civic holidays

Festivities

Dates of observance for moveable holidays

2020
February 3 – Constitution Day
March 16 – Benito Juarez's Birthday (Note: Celebrations after this date were generally low-key due to the COVID-19 pandemic in Mexico.)
April 9 – Holy Thursday 
April 10 – Good Friday
June 21 – Father's Day
November 16 – Revolution Day
2021
February 1 – Constitution Day
February 14 – Carnaval
March 15 – Benito Juarez's Birthday
April 1 – Holy Thursday
April 2 – Good Friday
June 20 – Father's Day
November 15 – Revolution Day
2022
February 7 – Constitution Day
February 27– Carnaval
March 21 – Benito Juarez's Birthday
April 10 – Holy Week begins
April 14 – Holy Thursday
April 15 – Good Friday
June 19 – Father's Day
November 21 – Revolution Day
2023
February 6 – Constitution Day
February 19– Carnaval
March 20 – Benito Juarez's Birthday
April 2 – Holy Week begins
April 6 – Holy Thursday
April 7 – Good Friday
June 19 – Father's Day
November 20 – Revolution Day
2024
February 5 – Constitution Day
February 11 – Carnaval
March 18 – Benito Juarez's Birthday
March 24 – Holy Week begins
March 28 – Holy Thursday
March 29 – Good Friday
June 2 or July 7 – 2024 General election in Mexico
June 16 – Father's Day
October 1 – Presidential Inauguration Day
November 18 – Revolution Day
2025
February 3 – Constitution Day
March 2 – Carnaval
March 17 – Benito Juarez's Birthday
April 13 – Holy Week begins
April 17 – Holy Thursday
April 18 – Good Friday
June 15 – Father's Day
November 17 – Revolution Day
2026
February 2 – Constitution Day
February 15 – Carnaval
March 16 – Benito Juarez's Birthday
March 29 – Holy Week begins
April 2 – Holy Thursday
April 3 – Good Friday
June 21 – Father's Day
November 16 – Revolution Day
2027
February 1 – Constitution Day
February 7 – Carnaval
March 15 – Benito Juarez's Birthday
March 21 – Holy Week begins
March 25 – Holy Thursday
March 26 – Good Friday
June 6 or July 4 - 2027 General election in Mexico
June 20 – Father's Day
November 15 – Revolution Day
2028
February 7 – Constitution Day
February 27 – Carnaval
March 20 – Benito Juarez's Birthday
April 9 – Holy Week begins
April 13 – Holy Thursday
April 14 – Good Friday
June 18 – Father's Day
November 20 – Revolution Day
2029
February 5 – Constitution Day
February 11 – Carnaval
March 19 – Benito Juarez's Birthday
March 25 – Holy Week begins
March 29 – Holy Thursday
March 30 – Good Friday
June 17 – Father's Day
November 19 – Revolution Day

See also
 
 Flag flying days in Mexico
 Christmas in Mexico
 Holy Week in Mexico

References

External links
Secretaría del Trabajo y Previsión Social

 
Mexico
Holidays